Colonel Vere Egerton Cotton C.B.E. (1882–1970) was a British Army officer and politician who served as Lord Mayor of Liverpool.

Biography
Cotton was born in London 5 May 1882 and was the youngest son of Charles Calveley Cotton.  Colonel Cotton was educated at Repton School and Magdalene College, Cambridge where he was an exhibitioner in 1910.  He was a senior partner in Rathbone Brothers and Company, merchants in Liverpool.

Cotton was commissioned in the 4th West Lancashire Brigade and during WW1 he served in France, Belgium and Italy. He was made an Officer of the British Empire in the 1919 New Year honours, awarded the Croix de Guerre and Croce di Guerra and held the Territorial Decoration.  From 1932-1936 he commanded the 359th Regiment , R.A., T.A., and retired from the army as a Lieutenant-Colonel. He was appointed Commander, Order of the British Empire (C.B.E.) in 1937.

Cotton entered the Liverpool City Council in 1931 as a representative of Aigburth Ward.  He was made a city magistrate in 1938. He served as Lord Mayor of Liverpool from 1951-52 and High Sheriff of Lancashire in 1956.

He is the father of Henry Egerton Cotton, Lord Lieutenant of Merseyside.

See also

 1931 Liverpool City Council election
 Liverpool City Council elections 1880–present
 Mayors and Lord Mayors of Liverpool 1207 to present
 High Sheriff of Lancashire

References

1882 births
1970 deaths
Alumni of the University of Cambridge
Mayors of Liverpool
High Sheriffs of Lancashire
Commanders of the Order of the British Empire